Locker Room is the third studio album recorded by American male vocal quartet Double Exposure, released in 1979 on the Salsoul label.

History
The album features the song, "I Got the Hots for Ya", which peaked at No. 33 on the Hot Soul Singles chart. It also peaked at No. 37 on the Hot Dance/Disco chart.

Track listing

Personnel
Leonard "Butch" Davis, Charles Whittington, Joseph Harris, James Williams – vocals
Keith Benson, Scotty Miller – drums
Jimmy Williams, Raymond Earl, Ron Baker – bass
Ron Kersey, Cotton Kent, Bruce Hawes, Bunny Sigler, Dennis Richardson, Bruce Gray, Luther Randolph – keyboards
Norman Harris, Bobby Eli, T.J. Tindall, Edward Moore – guitars
Larry Washington, James Walker, Bobby Conga – congas 
Ron Tyson – percussion
The Don Renaldo Strings and Horns – strings, horns on "I Got the Hots (For Ya)"
Reubin Henderson, Harold Watkins, Prestly Williams – horns
Walter Gibbons – tambourines, cowbell on "Ice Cold Love" and "I Wish That I Could Make Love to You"
Evette Benton, Carla Benson, Barbara Ingram – background vocals

Production
Ron Baker, Bruce Hawes, Ron Kersey, Bunny Sigler – producers
Joe Cayre, Stan Cayre, Ken Cayre – executive producers
Carl Paruolo, Dirk Devlin, Kenny Present, Rocky Schnaars – engineers
Jeff Stewart, Jay Mark – technicians
Bob Blank – mixing 
Stanley Hochstadt – art direction
Lori Lambert – design
Belott/Wolfson Photography – photography
Lloyd Gelassen – graphic supervision

Charts
Singles

References

External links
 

1979 albums
Double Exposure (band) albums
Albums recorded at Sigma Sound Studios
Salsoul Records albums